The Itinerarium Burdigalense ("Bordeaux Itinerary"), also known as the Itinerarium Hierosolymitanum ("Jerusalem Itinerary"), is the oldest known Christian itinerarium. It was written by the "Pilgrim of Bordeaux", an anonymous pilgrim from the city of Burdigala (now Bordeaux, France) in the Roman province of Gallia Aquitania.

It recounts the writer's journey throughout the Roman Empire to the Holy Land in 333 and 334 as he travelled by land through northern Italy and the Danube valley to Constantinople; then through the provinces of Asia and Syria to Jerusalem in the province of Syria-Palaestina; and then back by way of Macedonia, Otranto, Rome, and Milan.

Interpretation and analysis
According to the Catholic Encyclopedia: 

Another reader, Jaś Elsner, notes that, a brief twenty-one years after Constantine legalized Christianity, "the Holy Land to which the pilgrim went had to be entirely reinvented in those years, since its main siteancient Jerusalemhad been sacked under the Emperor Hadrian and refounded as Aelia Capitolina." Elsner found to his surprise "how swiftly a Christian author was willing implicitly to re-arrange and redefine deeply entrenched institutional norms, while none the less writing on an entirely traditional model [i.e., the established Greco-Roman genre of travel writing]."

The compiler of the itinerary was aware at each boundary of crossing from one Roman province to the next, and distinguished carefully between each change of horses (mutatio) and a stopover place (mansio), and the differences between the simplest cluster of habitations (vicus) and the fortress (castellum) or city (civitas). The segments of the journey are summarised; they are delineated by major cities, with major summaries at Rome and Milan, long-established centers of culture and administration, and Constantinople, refounded by Constantine only three years previously, and the "non-city" Jerusalem.

Glenn Bowman engaged in a close textual analysis of the Itinerarium; he argues that in fact it is a carefully structured work relating profoundly to Old and New Biblical dispensations via the medium of water and baptism imagery.

Manuscripts
The Itinerarium survives in four manuscripts, all written between the 8th and 10th centuries. Two give only the Judean portion of the trip, which is fullest in topographical glosses on the sites, in a range of landscape detail missing from the other sections, and Christian legend.

Similar itineraries
A well-known pilgrim itinerary of the sixth century, written by someone from Placentia/Piacenza, is attributed incorrectly to "Antoninus of Piacenza".

See also
Chronological list of early Christian geographers and pilgrims to the Holy Land who wrote about their travels, and other related works
Late Roman and Byzantine period
 Eusebius of Caesarea (260/65–339/40), Church historian and geographer of the Holy Land
 Egeria, pilgrim to the Holy Land (c. 381–384) who left a detailed travel account
 St Jerome (Hieronymus; fl. 386–420), translator of the Bible, brought an important contribution to the topography of the Holy Land
 Madaba Map, mosaic map of the Holy Land from the second half of the 6th century
 Anonymous Pilgrim from Piacenza, pilgrim to the Holy Land (570s) who left travel descriptions
Early Muslim period
 Paschal Chronicle, 7th-century Greek Christian chronicle of the world
 Arculf, pilgrim to the Holy Land (c. 680) who left a detailed narrative of his travels
Medieval period
 John of Würzburg, pilgrim to the Holy Land (1160s) who left travel descriptions

Notes

Further reading
 Kai Brodersen: Aetheria/Egeria, Reise in das Heilige Land. Lateinisch/deutsch (Sammlung Tusculum). Berlin und Boston: De Gruyter 2016.  (contains a bilingual edition of the Itinerarium Burdigalense)

External links
 An overview (with maps) of the account
 English translation, in a series of pages
 The Latin text, in one page
 The Bordeaux Pilgrim at Centuryone.com

Bechtel, Florentine (1910). Itineraria. Catholic Encyclopedia. 8. New York: Robert Appleton Company.

4th-century Latin books
Travel books
Latin prose texts
Medieval literature
Holy Land travellers
4th-century Christian texts
Roman itineraries
Pilgrimage accounts
331
Map types
4th century maps